Estonia competed at the inaugural 2018 European Championships from 2 to 12 August 2018. It competed in 5 sports of 7 with 55 athletes.

Competitors

Medallists

Aquatics

Swimming

Men

Athletics

References

2018
Nations at the 2018 European Championships
2018 in Estonian sport